Joshua George (born March 18, 1984) is a Paralympian athlete from the United States competing in category T53 events ranging from sprints to the marathon.

At the 2004 Summer Paralympics, George participated in seven events, winning bronze medals in the 100 and 400 metre races. He competed in the 2008 Summer Paralympics in Beijing, China.  There he won a gold medal in the men's 100 metres - T53 event, a silver medal in the men's 800 metres - T53 event, went out in the semi-finals of the men's 1500 metres - T53 event, finished fourth in the men's 200 metres - T53 event, went out in the first round of the men's 400 metres - T53 event, went out in the first round of the men's 4 x 400 metre relay - T53 event and  finished sixteenth in the men's Marathon - T54 event

In November 2014, George traveled to Brazil as a SportsUnited Sports Envoy for the U.S. Department of State. In this function, he worked with Allyson Felix to conduct clinics, speeches and other events for 510 youth, many of whom had disabilities or came from marginalized communities. The program was designed to remove barriers and create activities that benefit audiences with and without disabilities, whilst speaking with a young, at-risk public about important life and sports values, such as respect, discipline and overcoming adversity.

References

External links 
 
 

1984 births
Living people
American male track and field athletes
American disabled sportspeople
Paralympic track and field athletes of the United States
Paralympic gold medalists for the United States
Paralympic silver medalists for the United States
Paralympic bronze medalists for the United States
Athletes (track and field) at the 2008 Summer Paralympics
Athletes (track and field) at the 2004 Summer Paralympics
Athletes (track and field) at the 2012 Summer Paralympics
Athletes (track and field) at the 2016 Summer Paralympics
Medalists at the 2004 Summer Paralympics
Medalists at the 2008 Summer Paralympics
Medalists at the 2012 Summer Paralympics
Illinois Fighting Illini Paralympic athletes
Paralympic medalists in athletics (track and field)
People from Herndon, Virginia
Sportspeople from Fairfax County, Virginia
21st-century American people